Prachyanat is a theatre group of Bangladesh founded in 1997. On a wintery day of 1997, a handful of young theatre enthusiasts came to realize that, in order to give shape to some of their common ideas about art -theatre in particular – they should work from a common platform. The result was the commencing of the journey of a new theatre group ‘Prachyanat’ on 21 February 1997 ; named by Selim Al Deen, a legendary dramaturg of Bangladesh.

From the very outset, these youthful dreamers wanted this new group not to become just a mere addition in the already crowded theatre scenario of Dhaka. As a result of the tireless efforts of the members of Prachyanat, many of its dreams have now flowered into reality.Apart from producing more than ten full-length plays, all of which have been critically acclaimed and appreciated by theatre lovers at home and abroad, Prachyanat now has as many as eight different programmes in their pocket ─ all of which in one way or the other, keeps alive the passion for artistic creativity of its members and associates. 

This very young theatre group did not have to wait for long before institutional recognition came its way. Within two years of its existence, Prachyanat was allowed the distinction of being the best theatre group for the year 1999. Awards and other distinctions were quick to follow ─ such as The Best Theatre Group, The Best Play of the Year, The Best Light Design. 

Besides producing a number of successful plays by some of the foremost professionals of the country, another crowning success of Prachyanat is the establishment of Prachyanat School of Acting and Design in the year 2001. The school, only second of its kind in the country, has successfully run forty 6-month courses while its 41st and 42nd batch are already under way.

The most unique attribute this group has is its dynamism and this daringness which induced the group to come up with new areas of activity. The Theatre in the Open, Prachyanat for Children, Theatre–lab Production, Prachyanat Research Cell and the Musical Ensemble ― are all part of the group’s creative approach. Prachyanat’s future plan includes a fully equipped theatre centre that will become a hub of all its theatre activities.

Productions 

In the last eighteen years Prachyanat had eleven full length productions. Among these, two plays are written by the members of Prachyanat. One play of Prachyanat is a translated version of A Man for All Seasons, by the British playwright Robert Bolt. Another play of Prachyanat is "Gondar" (The Rhinoceros) from playwright Eugene Ionesco. In 2009 Prachyanat brought out a modernist version of Rabindranath’s symbolic play Raja ebong Onnanno. In 2009, Ibsen’s play "Punarjonmo" was made. Another is "The Hairy Ape", which is written by Eugene O'Neill and directed by Barker Bakul. Koinna, a play which is directed by Azad Abul Kalam, Murad Khan's script is based on a myth from the north-west of Bangladesh about ‘Koinnapir’. A play titled "Kinu Kaharer Thetar" is performed which is written by Manoj Mitra and directed by Kaji Taufiqul Islam Imon. In 2010, Prachyanat staged titled "Mayer Mukh", a translation of Arnold Wesker’s play. In the year of 2014, Prachyanat produced a play titled "Tragedy of Polashbari", script and directed by Azad Abul Kalam. In the year of 2019 Prachyanat presented their 35th production, Pulsiraat Originally written by Palestinian writer and political activist Ghassan Kanafani, it was published in 1962 as Men in the Sun. The story has been adapted by Monirul Islam Rubel, and directed by Kazi Toufikul Islam Emon. Same year Prachyanat produced Akhtaruzzaman Elias's internationally acclaimed novel the Khowabnama (খোয়াবনামা).This 37th production of Prachyanat has been adapted into a play by Shawkat Hossain Sajib and directed by Kazi Toufikul Islam Emon. At the end of 2022 Prachyanat has brought their 41th Production, 'Agunjatra'. Adapted from a radio-play called "Seven Steps Around the Fire", by Indian playwright Mahesh Dattani, "Agunjatra" has been translated into Bangla by Shahidul Mamun, with Azad Abul Kalam adapting and directing the play. Prachyanat premiered its 42nd production titled Achalayatan at the National Theatre Hall of Bangladesh Shilpakala Academy on 26th January 2023. Achalayatan has been written by Nobel laureate Rabindranath Tagore and directed by Azad Abul Kalam.

Prachyanat School of Acting and Design 
Prachyanat School of Acting and Design started its journey on 8 June, 2001. Its inception was inspired by a special concept that derived from the common thought of some of the young members of Prachyanat – the theater group which just began their journey in 1997. After crossing a certain miles, theater practice in Bangladesh has now come to a point where it stands face to face to the BOOM of the Multi-dimensional Culture and the Electronic Media. Still at such point of time, theater stands out as a complete media.

It is a successful teamwork that can carry the joyful march of theater practice forward. Members of newly founded Prachyanat felt that despite having an enthusiast team, the biggest constraint for the team to move forward would be the lack of proper knowledge and practice of its members in this field. Nowadays there are scopes to learn Dramatics academically but not everyone can avail them; even if they have vigorous eagerness to work in theater or any other medium of acting. From that thought, the young theater enthusiasts of the infant Prachyanat decided to begin the journey with Prachyanat School of Acting and Design – a platform that would provide a person with the basic one needs to know to engulf himself into the realm of acting or design, or even to have an improved life.

Prachyanat Musical Ensemble 

Prachyanat Musical Ensemble is a group with a fluid membership, mostly theater performers with musical abilities rather than professional musicians. Its first performance was in 2002. It specializes in the folk music of Bangladesh and West Bengal, and also renders popular songs from Prachyanat's plays, such as "Matitey Milay Matir Manush" from A Man for All Seasons, and others from Circus Circus and Koinya.

The musical ensemble took their production Phul, Phaki O Nodi'r Gaan (Music of the flowers, birds and rivers) on tour to Kathmandu, Nepal. The five-day tour in July 2009 was at the invitation of the out-going Bangladeshi Ambassador, Imtiaz Ahmed. Pieces performed included Shah Abdul Karim's song "Jhilmil jhilmil" as well as new compositions. According to a review in The Himalayan Times, "most of the numbers had an ethnic folk touch and the musicians played traditional as well as modern instruments".

Prachyanat Inhouse Theater 

Prachyanat is producing in-house theater productions regularly. In the year 2010 to promote emerging theatre activists, Prachyanat has organised a four daylong theatre festival, titled "Mahola Magan". The festival opened on March 15 at Studio Theatre Hall of Bangladesh Shilpakala Academy."Kathopokathan", "Trishonku", "Patar Khela" and "Bioscope" were staged. 'Mohola Mogon-2' arranged in 2020 where five plays had been staged on Prachyanat's floor in Katabon. The plays include The Zoo Story, The Dumb Waiter, Hundred by Hundred, No one writes to the Colonel and Faust or someone else. Edward Albee's Play The Zoo Story was translated into Bengali by Ashfaqul Ashekin. Directed by Kazi Taufiqul Islam Emon. The Dumb Waiter’ has been translated from the work of Harold Pinter by Md. Rabiul Alam and Md. Shawkat Hossain Sajib directed it.

References 

Theatre companies in Bangladesh
1997 establishments in Bangladesh
Organizations established in 1997